Six ships of the Royal Navy have borne the name HMS Nassau, after King William III who was of the House of Orange-Nassau, with the County of Nassau being a subsidiary holding of that family:

  was a 4-gun fluyt captured from the Dutch in 1672 and given away later that year.
  was an 80-gun third-rate ship of the line launched in 1699 and wrecked in 1706.
  was a 70-gun third-rate ship of the line launched in 1706, rebuilt in 1740 and sold in 1770.
  was a 64-gun third-rate ship of the line launched in 1785. She was converted into a 36-gun troopship in 1799 and was wrecked later that year.
 HMS Nassau was a 64-gun third rate originally named HMS Holstein, which the British captured at the Battle of Copenhagen in 1801. She was renamed HMS Nassau in 1805 and was sold in 1814.
  was a wooden screw gunvessel launched in 1866, having been completed as a survey ship. She was broken up in 1880.

References

Royal Navy ship names